AKM Hafizuddin (Died: 10 September 1979) He was a Bangladeshi politician, diplomat, government official, Inspector General of Police and Minister.

Career 
AKM Hafizuddin is the 1st Chairman of East Pakistan Industrial Development Corporation. Was ambassador. He is a former Inspector General of East Pakistan Police.

He served as an advisor to the Ministry of Industries in the cabinet of Abu Sadat Mohammad Sayem from 23 January 1976 to 10 July 1977.

He was the President of University of Dhaka Alumni Association from 1976 to 1979.

He was the Chairman of Investment Corporation of Bangladesh from 25 February 1978 to 20 September 1979.

References 

1979 deaths
Year of birth missing
Bangladeshi politicians
University of Dhaka alumni
Bangladesh Nationalist Party politicians
Bangladeshi civil servants
Bangladeshi diplomats